Street is a civil parish in County Westmeath, Ireland.

Street is one of 6 civil parishes in the barony of Moygoish in the Province of Leinster.

Street civil parish comprises 35 townlands: Athenboy, Ballew, Ballykildevin, Barradrum, Boherquill, Bottomy, Burgesland, Chancery, Clonava, Clonconnell, Clonkeen, Clonmore, Coolamber, Coolnagun, Cornacausk, Corralanna, Correaly, Culvin, Derradd, Dunamon, Fearmore, Garriskil, Gortanear, Hospitalbank, Kilmore, Kilshallow, Kiltareher, Lisduff, Lismacaffry, Lisnagappagh, Milkernagh, Monagead, Rath, Rehabane and Tinode.

The neighbouring civil parishes are: Lickbla (barony of Fore to the north–east, Mayne (barony of Fore) to the east, Lackan (barony of Corkaree) and Russagh to the south and Granard (County Longford), Mostrim (County Longford), and Street (County Longford} to the west.

See also
Street, County Westmeath

References

External links
Street civil parish at the IreAtlas Townland Data Base
Street civil parish at Townlands.ie
Street civil parish at Logainm.ie

Civil parishes of County Westmeath